Grace Ofure Ibhakhomu, also known as Grace Ofure, is a Nigerian economist, businesswoman, real estate expert, and philanthropist. She is the CEO of Lifecard International Investment Limited, proprietor and founder of Lifecard University, an online school, and the Grace Ofure Foundation, a charity organization.

Early life
Grace Ofure was born on April 28, 1978, in Ekpoma, Edo, Nigeria. She completed her primary and secondary education at University Primary School and University Secondary School in Ekpoma, respectively. She later received a Bachelor of Arts in Business Administration from Bendel State University (now Ambrose Alli University) in Ekpoma. Additionally, she received a degree in the Owner's Management Programme (OMP24) from the Lagos Business School.

Career
Ofure's business career began in 2003 when she sold second-hand clothes, known as "Okrika," and was mentored by an old classmate to focus on real estate investment. In 2019, she launched the Lifecard Company and currently serves as its CEO. Under her leadership, the company has expanded into several countries worldwide.

Philanthropy
In December 2020, Ofure created the "Nigerian for Nigeria Initiative Awards" as the managing director of Lifecard International Investment and established the Grace Ofure Foundation. The foundation supports and empowers women, children, and youths in society.

References

1978 births
Living people
Nigerian Christians
Nigerian philanthropists
20th-century Nigerian businesswomen
20th-century Nigerian businesspeople
21st-century Nigerian businesswomen
21st-century Nigerian businesspeople
Nigerian women company founders
Founders of charities
Nigerian real estate businesspeople
Nigerian corporate directors
Women corporate directors